Lo Ming-tsai (羅明才; born 15 January 1967) is a Taiwanese politician. He is a member of Kuomintang and represents New Taipei City Constituency XI in the Legislative Yuan.

Personal life 
He is the son of politician Lo Fu-chu.

References 

Living people
1967 births
20th-century Taiwanese politicians
21st-century Taiwanese politicians
Anti-same-sex-marriage activists
New Taipei Members of the Legislative Yuan
Members of the 4th Legislative Yuan
Members of the 5th Legislative Yuan
Members of the 6th Legislative Yuan
Members of the 7th Legislative Yuan
Members of the 8th Legislative Yuan
Members of the 9th Legislative Yuan
Members of the 10th Legislative Yuan
Kuomintang politicians in Taiwan
Kuomintang Members of the Legislative Yuan in Taiwan